Lanark is an unincorporated community in Cass County, Texas, 2 miles from Queen City. Lanark was started in 1870 when a railroad went through the town.  A post office existed from 1873-77. In 2000, the population was 30.

References

Unincorporated communities in Texas
Unincorporated communities in Cass County, Texas